The  is a standards organization and is the International Organization for Standardization (ISO) member body for Japan. It is also a member of the International Electrotechnical Commission.

The committee consists of a Council under the Ministry of Economy, Trade and Industry (METI), as well as two Boards established under it. Each of the Boards have their own Technical Committees, containing members which are parties among producers, dealers, users, consumers and academic circles.

The JISC establishes and maintains the Japanese Industrial Standards (JIS).

References

External links 
JISC - Japanese Industrial Standards Committee, official website
Japan (JISC) in ISO members database.

ISO member bodies
Standards organizations in Japan
Organizations established in 1949
1949 establishments in Japan